The Rotorua Caldera, now in filled with Lake Rotorua, is a large rhyolitic caldera. It is one of several large volcanoes located in the Taupō Volcanic Zone on the North Island of New Zealand.

Geography

The major regional settlement of Rotorua is located in the caldera. There is geothermal activity in the city of Rotorua and the geothermal areas of Tikitere and Whakarewarewa are associated with the caldera. These areas are still associated with small hydrothermal eruptions.

Geology

Eruption history
The eruption has been reinterpreted as a paired eruption with a very slightly later, slightly smaller southerly eruption from the same mush body feeding the Ohakuri Caldera. A small but rather thick outcrop named Mokai Ignimbrite exposed to the south-west, but beyond the known boundaries of much thinner at these boundaries, Mamaku ignimbrite, was erupted at close to the same time but likely from a different source. A different source would explain interlayered ash not present in northern Mamaku ignimbrite but there was close composition homogeneity suggesting a similar magma melt source. Perhaps rather than a very directional pyroclastic flow during the eruption events from a southern vent near Rotorua this formation is explained by more complex pairing with an unknown vent in the area of the Kapenga Caldera.

Caldera collapse occurred particularly during the eruption of middle layer of Mamaku Ignimbrite and in later stages of the eruption as the magma chamber underneath the volcano empted. Mokoia Island, close to the centre of the lake, is a rhyolite dome that later erupted. There are other domes like Hinemoa Point, Ngongotahā, Pohaturoa and Pukeroa. 

The most recent magmatic eruption occurred less than 25,000 years ago, creating some of the smaller lava domes. Mokoia Island has been assigned an age of less than 50,000 years.

240,000 years ago Ohakuri paired eruption

Between Rotorua and Ohakuri crosssections of the ash and ignimbrite from the two eruptions have been able to be sequenced completely and have relationships that can only be explained by a sequence of eruptions separated on occasions by days or less (e.g. no rainfall between eruptions). The pairing was possibly through tectonic coupling of separate magma bodies that co-evolved from a lower in the mantle common mush body, as paired events are being increasingly recognised. The maximum outflow dense-rock equivalent (DRE) of the Ohakuri ignimbrite is 100 cubic kilometres (24 cu mi) which means the combined eruptions produced  of material. 
This is an area known as the Horohoro Cliffs escarpment and displaced Mamaku ignimbrite from the Rotorua Caldera eruption by this amount, presumably shortly after at least the initial the eruption. This fault, in the present day, while active has a much lower displacement rate of the order of /year and has been assigned by some as the outer western fault of the modern Taupō Rift although most think this is further to the east. Understanding that there is volcanotectonic interrelationship lead to a complete reinterpretation of events in the Taupō Volcanic Zone in the last 250,000 years.

See also

 
 
 
 List of volcanoes in New Zealand
 
 Taupō Volcanic Zone
 Taupō Volcano
 Volcanology of New Zealand

References

External links
 Rotorua at Volcano World

Taupō Volcanic Zone
Rotorua
Calderas of New Zealand
VEI-7 volcanoes
Volcanoes of the Bay of Plenty Region
Rotorua Volcanic Centre
Pleistocene calderas
Geothermal areas in New Zealand